A number of studies have demonstrated adverse reactions in pets after administering vaccines to both dogs and cats. Concern about adverse effects has led to revised guidelines that alter the recommended frequency and methods/locations for both vaccination of dogs and feline vaccination.

Controversy
In recent years, vaccination has become a controversial topic among veterinarians and pet owners. Specific adverse reactions and general consequences for long-term health and immunity are both being cited as reasons to reduce the frequency of pet vaccination.

The 2010 pet vaccination guidelines published by the WSAVA (World Small Animal Veterinary Association) reduce the number of vaccines which should be considered core for pets, as well as recommending less frequent vaccine administration.

However, in an open letter to WSAVA, an Australian pet owner and long-time consumer advocate has created a detailed critique of these guidelines, with numerous scholarly citations, arguing that the 3-year booster or re-vaccination recommendations are either arbitrary or influenced by vaccine manufacturers. She cites the scientific findings of both WSAVA's and other leading researchers, which indicate that, similar to humans, the duration of immunity (DOI) for pets vaccinated early in life with MLV (modified live viruses) is many years, if not the entirety of adulthood, despite the common practice of "boosting" vaccines every 1 to 3 years.

In the executive summary section, the WSAVA guidelines do argue against needless vaccination and in support of "the development and use of simple in-practice tests for determination of seroconversion (antibody) following vaccination." They also note that "Vaccines should not be given needlessly. Core vaccines should not be given any more frequently than every three years after the 12 month booster injection following the puppy/kitten series, because the duration of immunity (DOI) is many years and may be up to the lifetime of the pet." The open letter critique focuses on the less-nuanced summary of these recommendations in the Tables given for vaccination guidelines, which could imply that re-vaccination should occur every 3 years.

Possible causes

Vaccine-specific
Adverse reactions usually occur because of a harmful immune-mediated reaction to either the vaccine immunogen itself or to the vaccine adjuvants, which are designed to boost the immune response to the vaccines. The immunogens may consist of killed or inactivated pathogens, bio-engineered pathogen proteins or polypeptides, or, increasingly rarely, modified live virus.

There have been no specific associations between development of vaccine-associated sarcoma and vaccine brand or manufacturer, concurrent infections, history of trauma, or environment.

In 1993, a causal relationship between VAS and administration of aluminum adjuvanted rabies and FeLV vaccines was established through epidemiologic methods.

Animal-specific
In addition to vaccine-specific factors, vets and owners should also consider pet-specific factors that have been shown to increase the risk of adverse reactions in both dogs and cats. Examples of such factors include:
 age, 
 number of vaccinations per office visit,
 size,
 general health of the animal,
 breed, 
 neutered status, and
 past vaccination history.

Types of reactions

Ischemic Dermatopathy / Cutaneous Vasculitis
A little known and often misdiagnosed reaction to the rabies vaccine in dogs, this problem may develop near or over the vaccine administration site and around the vaccine material that was injected, or as a more widespread reaction.  Symptoms include ulcers, scabs, darkening of the skin, lumps at the vaccine site, and scarring with loss of hair.  In addition to the vaccination site, lesions most often develop on the ear flaps (pinnae), on the elbows and hocks, in the center of the footpads and on the face. Scarring may be permanent. Dogs do not usually seem ill, but may develop fever. Symptoms may show up within weeks of vaccination, or may take months to develop noticeably.

Dogs with active lesion development and / or widespread disease may be treated with pentoxyfylline, a drug that is useful in small vessel vasculitis, or tacrolimus, an ointment that will help suppress the inflammation in the affected areas.

Owners and veterinarians of dogs who have developed this type of reaction should review the vaccination protocol critically and try to reduce future vaccinations to the extent medically and legally possible.  At the very least, vaccines from the same manufacturer should be avoided. It is also recommended that the location in which future vaccinations are administered should be changed to the rear leg, as far down on the leg as possible and should be given in the muscle rather than under the skin.

Urticaria / Anaphylaxis
Fortunately, severe systemic reaction to vaccine allergy is very rare in dogs. When it does occur, however, anaphylaxis is a life-threatening emergency.  More often, dogs will develop urticaria, or hives within minutes of receiving a vaccine.  When this occurs, a veterinarian will treat the reaction with antihistamines and corticosteroid drugs and this is usually effective.  Future vaccine protocols must be modified according to the vaccine component suspected to have triggered the reaction.

Development of antibodies against kidney tissue
FVRCP vaccines have also come under scrutiny of late due to possible risks to long-term health. A study at Colorado State University noted an association between vaccination with parenteral (injectable) FVRCP vaccinations and development of antibodies against feline kidney tissue. Antibody development is hypothesized to develop when the immune system reacts to protein contaminants from the cell line used to cultivate vaccinial viruses. The cell line in question, the Crandell-Rees Feline Kidney (CRFK) cell line, was derived from a cat kidney. It is currently unknown whether this antibody development can lead to renal disease, though a recent follow-up study demonstrated evidence of inflammation on re-biopsy samples from some of the study cats.

Sarcoma / Tumor
A Vaccine-associated sarcoma (VAS) is a type of malignant tumor found in cats (and rarely, dogs and ferrets) that has been linked to certain vaccines. Concern about VAS has resulted in changes in recommended vaccine protocols to limit the type, frequency, and sites of vaccinations. Owners are advised to monitor injection sites for signs of tumors and contact their veterinarian immediately if one develops.

Recommendations
Concerns about these adverse reactions have led to revised guidelines in 2006, 2010 and 2011 that address these concerns by altering the recommended frequency and methods/locations for both vaccination of dogs and feline vaccination.

Location
Vaccines should be given in specific areas in order to: ease identification of which vaccine caused an adverse reaction, and ease removal of any vaccine-associated sarcoma.

In North America, vets adopted the practice of injecting specific limbs as far from the body as possible, with the rear right for rabies, the rear left for leukemia, and the right front shoulder (being careful to avoid the midline or interscapular space) for other vaccines (such as FVRCP).

This set of locations was not widely adopted outside of North America, and the international Vaccination Guidelines Group (VGG) made new recommendations  that vaccines be administered:
 in subcutaneous (and not intramuscular) sites
 in the skin of the lateral thorax or abdomen (for easier excision of any FISS that occur)
 avoid the interscapular or intercostal regions (as more extensive surgical resection would be needed for sarcomas)
 in a different site on each occasion (either with general locations per species per year or diagrams of where administered on specific visit)

Frequency and type
In the 2010 recommendations of the international Vaccination Guidelines Group (VGG), they emphasized the importance of administering non-adjuvanted vaccines whenever possible.

The VGG also prefers serological testing over unnecessary re-vaccination or boosters of core vaccines after the initial 12-month booster that follows the puppy/kitten series of modified live virus [MLV] vaccines. This is because core vaccines show an excellent correlation between the presence of antibody and protective immunity and have a long DOI (Duration of Immunity). Antibody tests can be used to demonstrate the DOI after vaccination with core vaccines, though not for non-core vaccines.

See also
 Vaccination of dogs
 Feline vaccination
 Vaccine controversies
 Vaccine Adverse Event Reporting System

References

Further reading

External links

 
 
 
 
 
 
 
 

Cat health
Dog health
Animal vaccines